Osvold is a surname. Notable people with the surname include:

Joachim Osvold (born 1994), Norwegian footballer, son of Kjetil
Kjetil Osvold (born 1961), Norwegian footballer
Sissel Benneche Osvold (born 1945), Norwegian journalist
Totto Osvold (born 1941), Norwegian radio entertainer